James Russell Capps (February 26, 1931 – October 6, 2020) was a  Republican member of the North Carolina General Assembly from 1994 to 2006. Capps represented the state's 50th House District until the General Assembly redrew legislative districts. Capps then represented the 41st House District, which includes portions of the Town of Apex, Town of Cary, City of Raleigh, and the entire Town of Morrisville. The portion of Research Triangle Park (RTP) within Wake county as well as Raleigh-Durham International Airport (RDU) are also in the district.

Capps was born in Raleigh, North Carolina. He graduated from Hugh Morson High School in Raleigh. Capps went to the Radio/Television Institute of Chicago. He graduated from Wake Forest University in 1956 with a bachelor's degree in sociology. Capps was involved in the radio and television business in Raleigh. Capps went to the Southeastern Baptist Theological Seminary and served as a volunteer pastor at a Baptist church in Raleigh.

In the 2006 general election, Capps was defeated by Democratic challenger Ty Harrell.

Capps attempted a comeback to the NC State House in 2012, but was defeated by Jim Fulghum in the May primary election.

References

External links 

|-

|-

Republican Party members of the North Carolina House of Representatives
2020 deaths
1931 births
Politicians from Raleigh, North Carolina
Wake Forest University alumni
21st-century American politicians